An underwater locator beacon is a device that guides search and rescue teams to a submerged aircraft by emitting a repeated electronic pulse.

Application
An underwater locator beacon (ULB) or underwater acoustic beacon, is a device fitted to aviation flight recorders such as the cockpit voice recorder (CVR) and flight data recorder (FDR). ULBs are also sometimes required to be attached directly to an aircraft fuselage. ULBs are triggered by water immersion; most emit an ultrasonic 10ms pulse once per second at 37.5 kHz ± 1 kHz.

Research by the French Bureau d'Enquêtes et d'Analyses pour la Sécurité de l'Aviation Civile (BEA) has shown that it has had a 90% survival rate spanning 27 air accidents over the sea. The ULBs fitted in Air France Flight 447, which crashed on 1 June 2009, were certified to transmit at 37.5 kHz for a minimum of 30 days at a temperature of 4 °C. Investigating the crash, the BEA recommended that FDR ULBs' transmission period be increased to 90 days and for "airplanes performing public transport flights over maritime areas to be equipped with an additional ULB capable of transmitting on a frequency (for example between 8.5 kHz and 9.5 kHz) and for a duration adapted to the pre-localisation of wreckage" (i.e. with increased range).

On ships built on or after 1 July 2014, underwater locating devices must ensure a regulatory transmission time of at least 90 days.

Power source and activation
A beacon is typically supplied with electrical power by a lithium battery, which needs to be replaced after several years. Once the beacon becomes immersed into water, a built-in "water switch" activates it via the water's presence completing an electrical circuit, and the beacon starts emitting its "pings"; the battery power should be sufficient for 30 to 40 days after the activation.
The minimum battery voltage  is 2.97 volts and the maximum is 3.5 volts.

The National Transportation Safety Board reported a case in 1988, involving an Aerospatiale AS-355F-1 helicopter, when the water switch had accidentally activated during the aircraft's normal operation; as a result, the battery power had been  exhausted by the time the accident happened, and the beacon was not emitting the acoustic signal when it needed to do so.

Maximum detection range 
A 37.5 kHz (160.5 dB re 1 μPa) pinger can be detectable  from the surface in normal conditions and  under ideal conditions.

See also
 Towed pinger locator
 Underwater acoustics
 Sonar
 Emergency locator beacon

References

External links

 DK120 Underwater Acoustic Beacon
 Underwater Locator Beacon detection ranges for fuselage encapsulated recorders (FAA 1968 study)

Aircraft emergency systems
Beacons